Textron Aviation Inc. is the general aviation business unit of the conglomerate Textron that was formed in March 2014 following the acquisition of Beech Holdings which included the Beechcraft and Hawker Aircraft businesses. The new business unit includes the Textron-owned Cessna. Textron Aviation sells Beechcraft and Cessna branded aircraft. While no longer selling new Hawker airplanes, Textron Aviation still supports the existing Hawker aircraft fleet through its service centers.

The CEO of Cessna, Scott Ernest, was named as the first CEO of Textron Aviation Incorporated. In October 2018, Ronald Draper succeeded Ernest to become the second CEO of Textron Aviation.

History
Textron completed its purchase of Beech Holdings in March 2014 for approximately US$1.4 billion in cash. The parent company, Textron, financed the equity purchase and the repayment of Beechcraft's debt in cash, plus its issue of US$600 million in senior notes and a new US$500 million five-year term loan.

Once the purchase was completed on March 14, 2014, Textron combined Beechcraft with its existing Cessna subsidiary to form Textron Aviation and brought all production under the new company name. The old companies become brands of the new company due to their historical significance and name recognition.

In January 2017, the company announced lay-offs as a result of falling business jet and turboprop sales and company profits. Textron CEO Scott Donnelly indicated that customers are seeking pricing levels that the company is not willing to support.

In the first quarter of 2017 company revenues were down US$121 million compared to 2016, as a result of lower sales of military and commercial turboprop aircraft. The company made a first quarter 2017 profit of US$36 million, down from US$73 million in the first quarter of 2016.

Sales of the Cessna 400 had been slow, with only 23 of the model being sold in 2017. In February 2018, the company ceased production of the aircraft.

In April 2022, Textron purchased Slovenian manufacturer Pipistrel to form a new division called Textron eAviation, for electric aircraft development.

In January 2023 Textron Aviation announced that it had made a milestone delivery. The delivery of a Cessna Grand Caravan EX marked the 3000th Cessna Caravan family turboprop delivered.

Products
Textron Aviation's various lines of aircraft, including the Cessna single-engined piston and turboprop aircraft and jets, Beechcraft piston and turboprops are seen by the company as complementary to each other and not as competitors. Textron Aviation also produces the Beechcraft T-6 Texan II trainer and AT-6 light attack variant. The company does not produce the Hawker jets, but provides parts support for them.

By 2015, Textron Aviation companies have delivered nearly 251,000 aircraft, exceeding 100 million flight hours, in over 170 countries. It provides aircraft parts and engineering support for them.

Aircraft

References

External links
 

Aircraft manufacturers of the United States
Manufacturing companies established in 2014
American companies established in 2014
 
2014 establishments in Kansas
Manufacturing companies based in Kansas
Companies based in Wichita, Kansas